Free Society Conference and Nordic Summit (FSCONS) is a Nordic conference trying to bridge the gap between software and cultural freedom held each autumn in Gothenburg, Sweden. It shares many similarities with FOSDEM (Free and Open source Software Developers' European Meeting) in the way in which the event is structured, but where the latter attracts speakers and visitors primarily interested in Free software, FSCONS aims to attract a more diverse crowd. The conference was organised 2007-2011 by FFKP, the Society for Free Culture and Software. In 2012, a new member run association was formed to take over the organisation of conference.

Conference history
The event was first organised by members of the Free Software Foundation Europe, in particular its Swedish team and the then current intern in their Gothenburg office. It was organised the 7–8 December 2007 and attracted about 80 visitors. Some of the speakers were Jonas Öberg, Mats Östling, Lars Aronsson and Georg C. F. Greve.

Through the years 2008-2011, the conference was organised once a year, always in October or November. In 2008, the FSFE was joined by Wikimedia Sverige and Creative Commons Sweden as co-organisers of the event.

Notable speakers over the years include Richard Stallman, Smári McCarthy, Oscar Swartz, Dr. Ansgar Bernardi, Christina Haralanova, Amelia Andersdotter, Marcin Jakubowski, Erik Zachte, Edmund Harriss, Karin Kosina, Henri Bergius, Glyn Moody, Erik de Bruijn, and, Alessandro Rubini, to mention a few.

In 2012 the member-run association Föreningen FSCONS was formed to take over the organisation of the conference from FFKP. The conference has continued to be held in November each year.

Nordic Free Software Award 
FSFE and is presenting the winner of the yearly Nordic Free Software Award, given to the person/project that have made a contribution to the advancement of Free Software in the Nordic countries. The jury consists of member from FSFE and Föreningen fri kultur och programvara (Free Culture and Software) and members from the free software community.

Winners 
 2007 : Skolelinux
 2008 : Mats Östling
 2009 : Simon Josefsson & Daniel Stenberg
 2010 : Bjarni Rúnar Einarsson
 2011 : Erik H. Josefsson
 2012 : Otto Kekäläinen and Ole Tange

References

External links 

 Official website fscons.org
 FSCONS conference blog
 Summaries of previous FSCONS conferences
 Press mentions
 "Frihetskämpar möts i Göteborg" (ComputerSweden - Swedish) 2011-11-11 17:00
 "Hallå Håkan Lidbo!" (GP - Swedish) 2011-11-11
 "Fri programvara en väg till arbetarmakt" (Fria tidningen - Swedish) 2010-11-11 10:05
 "När kommer öppen hårdvara?" (ComputerSweden - Swedish) 2010-11-17 16:06
 "Solidarisk programvara" (Fria tidningen - Swedish) 2011-05-04 08:00
 "Konferens som vidgar samtalet" (Fria tidningen - Swedish) 2011-05-18 08:00
 "Nördfeministisk kraftsamling" (Fria tidningen - Swedish) 2011-05-18 08:00
 "Das Openmoko-Projekt um die gleichnamige freie Handyplattform lädt im Rahmen der FSCONS in Göteborg, Schweden" (Linux Magazine - German) 2008-10-08
 (Miljömagasinet - Swedish) "De vill arbeta för fri programvara", 2010-06-24
 "Konferens om fri programvara" (Fria tidningen - Swedish) 2010
 "Teknikjournalisten och författaren Glyn Moody till Sverige" (Webfinanser - Swedish) 2010-10-19 13:51
 "Linux-Norge overhaler Danmark indenom" (Computerworld - Danish) 2007-12-12
 "Späckat schema på FSCONS i Göteborg" (ComputerWorld/LinuxWorld - Swedish) 2007-12-12
 "U-landsdatorn blev hans stora hobby" (ComputerSweden - Swedish) 2007-12-11
 "Skolelinux fikk pris for fri programvare" (Computerworld - Norwegian) 2007-12-10

Linux conferences
Free-software conferences
Recurring events established in 2007